is a private university in Niigata, Niigata, Japan. The school originally opened as a women's junior college in 1965.

External links
 Official website 

Educational institutions established in 1965
Private universities and colleges in Japan
Niigata (city)
Universities and colleges in Niigata Prefecture
1965 establishments in Japan